Loděnice may refer to:

Loděnice (Beroun District), Czech Republic
Loděnice (Brno-Country District), Czech Republic

See also
Horní Loděnice